A list of films produced in Italy in 1973 (see 1973 in film):

Notes

References

External links
Italian films of 1973 at the Internet Movie Database

1973
Films
Lists of 1973 films by country or language